Gharjistan University is a university located in Pul-e-Sorkh, Kabul, Afghanistan established in 2010.

Faculties
 Economics and management
 Law and political science
 Computer science
 Social science

See also
List of universities in Afghanistan

References

Universities in Afghanistan
Universities and colleges in Kabul
Educational institutions established in 2010
2010 establishments in Afghanistan